Arda Kızıldağ (born 15 October 1998) is a Turkish professional footballer who plays as a defender for Gaziantep in the Turkish Süper Lig.

Professional career
Kızıldağ made his professional debut for Gençlerbirliği in a 4-0 Süper Lig loss to Gazişehir Gaziantep F.K. on 26 August 2019.

On 16 June 2022, Kızıldağ signed a three-year contract with Gaziantep.

International career
Kızıldağ represented the Turkey U23s in their winning campaign at the 2021 Islamic Solidarity Games.

Honours
Turkey U23
Islamic Solidarity Games: 2021

References

External links
 
 
 

1998 births
People from Yenimahalle
Living people
Turkish footballers
Turkey under-21 international footballers
Association football defenders
Gençlerbirliği S.K. footballers
Hacettepe S.K. footballers
Gaziantep F.K. footballers
Süper Lig players
TFF First League players
TFF Second League players